Pungtungia is a genus of cyprinid fish found in Eastern Asia.  There are currently three described species in this genus.

Species
There are currently three recognized species in this genus:
 Pungtungia herzi Herzenstein, 1892
 Pungtungia hilgendorfi (D. S. Jordan & Fowler, 1903)
 Pungtungia shiraii Ōshima, 1957

References

 
Taxa named by Solomon Herzenstein
Cyprinid fish of Asia